A number of steamships were named Volos, including:

 , a German cargo ship wrecked in 1929
 , a German cargo ship in service 1946–48

Ship names